Sturgeon Lake is lake in the Canadian province of Saskatchewan. It is a small, narrow body of water situated in the transition zone between the aspen parkland and boreal forest biomes. It is located along the course of Sturgeon River, which has its headwaters in Prince Albert National Park and the Waskesiu Hills. The Sturgeon River is a tributary of the North Saskatchewan River. A small dam at the eastern end of the lake helps regulate water levels.

The lake is surrounded by the Sturgeon Lake First Nation and the RM of Shellbrook No. 493. Access to Sturgeon Lake is from Highways 788 and 693.

Sturgeon Lake Regional Park 
Sturgeon Lake Regional Park is a regional park on the northern shore of Sturgeon Lake. Founded in 1965, the park offers camping, boating, swimming, and picnicking. The campground has 55 campsites, potable water, washrooms and showers, and electrical hook-ups. The park also has a store, restaurant, and canoe / kayak rentals. The park was awarded the Saskatchewan Regional Park of the Year in 2014.

Fish species 
Fish commonly found in the lake include northern pike, yellow perch, and walleye.

See also 
List of lakes of Saskatchewan

References 

Lakes of Saskatchewan
Shellbrook No. 493, Saskatchewan
Division No. 16, Saskatchewan